Fakhrabad (also Romanized as Fakhrābād) is a village in Behnamvasat-e Jonubi Rural District, Javadabad District, Varamin County, Tehran Province, Iran. At the 2006 census, its population was 35, in 5 families.

References 

Populated places in Varamin County